Grimbergen is a municipality in the Belgian province of Flemish Brabant, 10 km north of the capital Brussels. It comprises the towns of Beigem, Grimbergen, Humbeek, and Strombeek-Bever. In 2017, it had a population of 37,030 and an area of 38.61 km2, giving a population density of 959 inhabitants per km2.

Grimbergen is in the Dutch language area of Belgium. The French-speaking minority is represented by four members on the 30-seat local council. Grimbergen is mostly known for its Norbertine abbey and the beer once brewed there. Grimbergen's proximity to Brussels makes it a residential town for commuting.

History

Roman Empire and Middle Ages
In Roman times, several important roads passed near the territory of present Grimbergen. A fort was built in the 8th century at the strategic point where the road crossed the river Zenne. The local lord soon acquired a large piece of territory in this area, extending to the rivers Scheldt, Rupel, and Dender.

In the 12th century, the name of the hamlet was Grentberghis,  which came from the Old Dutch Grientbergen, meaning mounds of coarse sand. A community of Augustinian monks had already tried to settle here a century earlier during the reign of Godfrey III, Duke of Lower Lorraine, but it was only in the early 12th century that their religious community prospered. Under the leadership of Norbert of Xanten, the Norbertine monks built the Grimbergen Abbey here in 1128, founding a beer brewery. A few years later, the animosity between the powerful Grimbergen family and their then infant overlord Godfrey III of Leuven precipitated the Wars of Grimbergen. The unrest caused the destruction of the local castle by the Duke of Brabant, the move of the ruling Grimbergen lord to nearby Ninove, and the parceling of his territory. The city's coat of arms dates from that period.

At the beginning of the 14th century, half of the territory became part of the estate of the House of Nassau. Like everywhere else in Flanders, the Wars of Religion of the end of the 16th century caused widespread destruction. In 1752, Anne, Princess Royal and Princess of Orange, who had received the land from her consort William IV, Prince of Orange-Nassau, ceded the barony to the Prince of Berghes, who owned the other half, thereby reuniting the original land of Grimbergen as a single, but short-lived, princedom.

After the French Revolution
The feudal regime and the power of the lords came to an abrupt end under the French Regime in 1794. The clerical powers of the abbey were abrogated a couple of years later, until a few years after the Belgian Revolution of 1830.

Up until then, the town's character was mostly rural and agricultural. In the middle of the 19th century, the new road linking Vilvoorde to Aalst and the Brussels-Willebroek canal started attracting industrial concerns. The vicinal tramway arrived in 1887, and a local airfield was built after World War I.

Sights
Grimbergen is home to the following sights:

The majestic church of the Grimbergen Abbey, dedicated to Saint Servatius, patron saint of the city, was rebuilt several times since its foundation in 1128. The current construction dates from 1660 and ranks among the most harmonious Baroque buildings in Belgium.  The tower houses a 49-bell carillon.  The houses lining the central square in front of the church have also been rebuilt in the original style of the 18th century. In 1999, the church of Grimbergen was given the title of basilica.
The Grimbergen beer museum is located next door and gives its visitors an opportunity to taste the famous local brew.
The oldest astronomical public observatory in the country  is located in the former farm dependencies of the abbey.
Grimbergen is particularly rich in castles, counting four of them on its territory, including the beautiful 17th century Renaissance-style Guldendal, and the ruins of the lords of Grimbergen's old keep now named the Prinsenkasteel.  It also counts several farms dating from the 17th century as well as two medieval water mills.
Volkssterrenwacht Mira. It is the oldest planetarium in Belgium founded in 1967. The original planetarium was located in the Abbey of Grimbergen, however in 2000 an extension was added.

Events and sports
The main annual event is the Sint-Servaasommegang, loosely translated as procession of Saint Servatius.  It dates from 1280 and takes place on the Saint's birthday, May 13, or on the first following Sunday.
A well-attended kermesse takes place on the first Sunday of September.
A nativity scene is organized in the abbey church around Christmas.
The main football club used to be K.F.C. Strombeek, but is now named F.C. Molenbeek Brussels Strombeek and located in neighboring Sint-Jans-Molenbeek.
Since 2015 Grimbergen has its own field hockey club named Merode Hockey Grimbergen. After only tree years they got enough funding together to build a state of the art hockey field. Starting from January 2019 the club will be playing their own field at the Populierendallaan 111.

Notable people
August De Winter (1925–2005), politician
Hugo Broos (born 1952), former football player and coach
Alison Van Uytvanck (born 1994), tennis player

References

External links

Official Website (in Dutch, with some tourist information in English)
Official Website of the Museum for Old Techniques (in Dutch/French/English)
The Prince's Fort in Grimbergen - Werbeka Netshop (in English)
Alternate website (in Dutch)
Carillon (mostly in Dutch)

Municipalities of Flemish Brabant